The 1970 Sam Houston State Bearkats football team represented Sam Houston State University as a member of the Lone Star Conference (LSC) during the 1970 NAIA Division I football season. Led by third-year head coach Tom Page, the Bearkats compiled an overall record of 8–2–1 with a mark of 7–2 in conference play, and finished second in the LSC.

Schedule

References

Sam Houston State
Sam Houston Bearkats football seasons
Sam Houston State Bearkats football